B.M.C. Durfee High School is an historic former high school building at 289 Rock Street in Fall River, Massachusetts. The school was built in 1886 and added to the National Register of Historic Places in 1981. In 1978, it was replaced by the current B.M.C. Durfee High School building. The old building was restored in the early 1990s and is now operated as a probate and family courthouse by the Commonwealth of Massachusetts.

Historical background

The building was built as a donation from Mrs. Mary B. Young to the people of the city of Fall River, in memory of her son Bradford Matthew Chaloner Durfee, who had died at a young age in 1872, leaving a sizable inheritance.

George A. Clough, a Boston architect was chosen to design the building. Ground was broken in August 1883. The first story of the school is constructed of native Fall River Granite, while the stone of the upper portions is from Mason, New Hampshire. The new high school was formally dedicated to the city on June 15, 1887.

The building occupies a commanding position atop a hill in the city's Highlands neighborhood, and is visible from miles around. Even today, the school's sports teams are known as the "Durfee Hilltoppers".

Recent history
In 1978, the city opened a new, much larger high school in the north end, also named "B.M.C. Durfee High School". The old high school remained vacant until the early 1990s when it was taken over by the Commonwealth of Massachusetts, for use as a Probate Court House. The restoration was completed in the mid-1990s. The Southeast branch of the Massachusetts Housing Court is located in the building as well.

Telescope
The building features a rare 4-foot telescope with an 8-inch lens, built by the Warner & Swasey Company in 1887. The observatory sat idle for decades, until volunteers began work restoring the telescope and clock mechanism in 2009. The telescope opened for public viewing for select nights in 2015.

See also
National Register of Historic Places listings in Fall River, Massachusetts
Highlands Historic District (Fall River, Massachusetts)
B.M.C. Durfee High School (present)

External links
 1889 Dedication Brochure for the B.M.C. Durfee High School Building, includes full remarks of the dedication ceremony, building floor plans, and more.

References

School buildings completed in 1886
Buildings and structures in Fall River, Massachusetts
School buildings on the National Register of Historic Places in Massachusetts
George A. Clough buildings
Schools in Bristol County, Massachusetts
National Register of Historic Places in Fall River, Massachusetts
Historic district contributing properties in Massachusetts